Kali Charan Hembram (born 1 May 1960) is an Indian writer of Santali language and civil servant from Odisha. He won the Sahitya Akademi Award for Santali in 2019.

Biography
Hembram was born on 1 May 1960 in Mayurbhanj. He completed his school life from Bahalda High School. Later, he was admitted into Tata College and graduated from there. He is working as a section officer at the Council of Higher Secondary Education in Bhubaneswar.

Hembram involved in writing books, plays and songs in Santali. He was the dialogue writer of a Santali film titled Jiwi Jury.

Hembram is the writer of anthology of short stories titled Sisirjali. This book was published in 2013. It is his first published book. The book consists of 15 short stories. For this book he was awarded Sahitya Akademi Award for Santali in 2019.

Selected bibliography
 Bousoyem Upol 
 Dhibur Gating 
 Jabor Gansng 
 Damadol 
 Guligodoriyo 
 Saota Sechet 
 Nirmoya Dharti 
 Timir Sagingre Lo-Beer 
 Donmese Barudang Tala Tordang 
 Sisirjali 
 Sirjon Kahet

References

Living people
1960 births
People from Mayurbhanj district
Indian civil servants
Recipients of the Sahitya Akademi Award in Santali
Kolhan University alumni